Roger Wilfred Davis (born June 23, 1938) is a former professional American football player who played offensive lineman for seven seasons for the Chicago Bears, the Los Angeles Rams, and the New York Giants. He was drafted by the Bears in the first round (7th overall) of the 1960 NFL Draft, and is one of only two guards drafted in the first round by the team (Kyle Long being the other).

References

1938 births
Living people
American football offensive guards
American football offensive tackles
Chicago Bears players
Los Angeles Rams players
New York Giants players
Syracuse Orange football players
All-American college football players
Players of American football from Cleveland